Tinagma bledella is a moth in the  family Douglasiidae. It is found in Algeria.

The wingspan is about 8.5 mm. The forewings are white, but reddish-brown in the costal region. The hindwings are violaceous-brown.

References

Moths described in 1915
Douglasiidae